A Leap for Love is a 1912 American short romantic drama film released on 13 April 1912 by Independent Motion Picture Company.

Cast
Ethel Wright as Marguerite Leonard
Frank Hall Crane as Samuel Kingston
Rodman Law as Alfred Lane
Hayward Mack as Ralph Judson

References

External links
 

1912 films
American romantic drama films
1912 romantic drama films
American silent short films
1912 short films
American black-and-white films
1910s American films
Silent romantic drama films
Silent American drama films